Archibald Sorbie Heslop (27 January 1903 – 1962) was an English professional footballer who played as an outside right. He played in the Football League for Burnley and Luton Town.

References

1903 births
1962 deaths
Date of death missing
Footballers from County Durham
English footballers
Association football outside forwards
Annfield Plain F.C. players
Burnley F.C. players
West Stanley F.C. players
Luton Town F.C. players
Spennymoor United F.C. players
English Football League players